St. Andrew's Cathedral is the Roman Catholic cathedral for the diocese of Victoria in British Columbia, Canada. Built in the High Victorian Gothic style, St. Andrew's was Victoria's third cathedral to be built.

History
The cathedral is the third building to be used by the parish. The first building was used from 1858 to 1884 (presently used as the Chapel of St. Ann's Academy on Humboldt Street). The second building was used from 1884 to 1892 (situated behind the current building now occupied by the St. Andrew's Square office building), after which the parish moved into the present cathedral.

Work on the new cathedral began in 1890. At 8:00 a.m. on October 30, 1892, Bishop Jean-Nicolas Lemmens blessed the building before celebrating a Pontifical High Mass at 10:00 a.m. The cathedral has been a National Historic Site of Canada since 1990.

Design
The present cathedral was designed by architects Maurice Perrault and Albert Mesnard. The total cost of the building was C$81,052 Based on the plans for a church built in Vaudreuil-Dorion, Quebec, Perrault and Mesnard borrowed much from the medieval architecture of European churches. The double asymmetrical towers are typical of Quebec churches and a characteristic of the High Victorian Gothic style. This was an attempt to follow the "unfinished" look that made fourteenth and fifteenth century churches popular. The main tower boasts a  spire that was designed to hold a clock and a set of bells.

The Institute for Stained Glass in Canada has documented the stained glass at St Andrew's Catholic Cathedral. The cathedral houses 21 large Portland-style stained glass windows and two large rose windows with a smaller one above the gallery.

An altar was commissioned for use on the twenty-fifth anniversary of Bishop Remi Joseph De Roo's episcopal ordination. Carved by Charles W. Elliott, the first Native American to graduate from St. Louis College, the altar consists of two bentwood boxes. The boxes can be rotated to show four separate designs for the different liturgical seasons. The top of the altar or is carved from yellow cedar (Nootka Cypress) and weighs approximately four hundred pounds.

The cathedral also displays a carved lectern by artist Roy Henry Vickers. It depicts a black and red image of Christ, representing the crucified Christ and the risen Christ.

Crypt
The cathedral houses a crypt, where three of Victoria's former Bishops are interred:

 Bishop Modeste Demers, the first Bishop of Victoria.
 Charles John Seghers, the second and fourth Bishop, murdered in Alaska.
 Rt. Rev. John J. Jonckau, a former Vicar General of the Diocese of Victoria who was named as Bishop but died before being consecrated.

See also 
 List of cathedrals in Canada
 List of historic places in Victoria, British Columbia

Notes

References

External links 

 

Saint Andrews
National Historic Sites in British Columbia
Saint Andrews
Saint Andrews
Tourist attractions in Victoria, British Columbia
Roman Catholic churches on the National Historic Sites of Canada register